Georges Beaucourt (15 April 1912 – 1 March 2002) was a French association football player who participated at the 1934 FIFA World Cup. He played club football with Lille and Lens; he was also the manager of Lens between 1941 and 1942.

References

External links
 
 
 Profile on French federation official site  
 Profile at sitercl.com

1912 births
2002 deaths
Sportspeople from Roubaix
French footballers
France international footballers
French football managers
1934 FIFA World Cup players
Olympique Lillois players
RC Lens players
Ligue 1 players
RC Lens managers
Association football defenders
Footballers from Hauts-de-France